The 1909–10 international cricket season was from September 1909 to April 1910. The season consists with a single international tour.

Season overview

January

England in South Africa

References

International cricket competitions by season
1909 in cricket
1910 in cricket